Thyago Fernandes de Moraes, (Rio de Janeiro, 30 August 1987) is a Brazilian professional footballer who plays for Murici F.C  .

Contract
 Murici Futebol Clube.

References

External links

1987 births
Brazilian footballers
Living people
Association football forwards
Footballers from Rio de Janeiro (city)